The Department of Human Settlements (formerly the Department of Housing) is the department under the Ministry of Human Settlements, of the South African government responsible for housing and urban development. Its primary purpose is the implementation of the constitutional mandate that "everyone has the right to have access to adequate housing." It works in co-operation with the provincial governments, each of which has its own Human Settlements department, and with the municipalities.

 the Minister of Human Settlements is Mmamoloko Kubayi-Ngubane and her deputy is Pamela Tshwete. In the 2011/12 budget the department had a budget of R22 578 000 000 and a staff complement of 609 civil servants.

References

External links
 Official website

Housing
South Africa